HD 60803 is a binary star system in the equatorial constellation of Canis Minor, located less than a degree to the northwest of the prominent star Procyon. It has a yellow hue and is visible to the naked eye as a dim point of light with a combined apparent visual magnitude of 5.904. The distance to this system is 135 light years as determined using parallax measurements, and is drifting further away with a radial velocity of +4.6 km/s.

The binary nature of this star system was first noted by O. C. Wilson and A. Skumanich in 1964. It is a double-lined spectroscopic binary with an orbital period of 26.2 days and an eccentricity of 0.22. Both components are similar, G-type main-sequence stars; the primary has a stellar classification of G0V while the secondary has a class of G1V. The masses are similar to each other, and are 28–31% greater than the mass of the Sun. They have low rotation rates which may be quasi-synchronized with their orbital period.

References

G-type main-sequence stars
Spectroscopic binaries
Canis Minor
Durchmusterung objects
060803
037031